HTV2, officially Vie Channel - HTV2, is a general entertainment channel broadcast by Ho Chi Minh City Television, in cooperation with the private entertainment brand Vie Channel.

History

HTV2 was born and broadcast experimentally on October 10, 2003, on channel 30 UHF along with channels HTV1 and HTV3 with a duration of nine hours a day. From November 1, 2003, HTV2 officially broadcasts from 6 am to 24 hours daily, owned by HTV.

At SEA Games 22, most of the tournament's competitions were broadcast on HTV2 channel, making a significant contribution to the propaganda of the regional congress.  Southeast Asia that Vietnam hosted for the first time.

Tournaments are streamed by HTV2, along with HTV9, such as the traditional Golden Racquet table tennis tournament, Southeast Asia Challenger soccer, V-League soccer, Spanish La Liga soccer, Italian soccer, World Cup soccer, badminton, volleyball, swimming, Grand Slam tennis, MotoGP European motorcycle racing, AFF Cup, and the ASIAD.

Since 2006, following the policy of socialization the air channels of Ho Chi Minh City Television, the station has cooperated with the Company international Anh Binh Minh Media belongs to Dat Viet Group to cooperate in broadcasting & producing HTV2 channel programs. During this time, HTV2 started broadcasting to entertainment, live events, music and movie... in addition, the channel also played the role of playback.  movies and game shows on HTV9 and HTV7;  at the same time sports matches are still broadcast normally.

However, after three to four years of building sports channel and the cooperation with Anh Binh Minh Company, in order to improve the program infrastructure as well as broadcast better and better, Ho Chi Minh City Television Station] and Anh Binh Minh Company, belonging to Dat Viet Media Complex, cooperated to expand content for HTV2. This time, HTV2 is oriented as "tv channel 2 in 1" - that is, both broadcasting sports content and simultaneously broadcasting entertainment programs -  with a duration of 24/7 from May 5, 2008, testing in the form of a slide show at 7pm - 11pm (including re-broadcasting of feature films and gameshows of HTV9 and HTV7).  Matches in Euro, Olympic, English Premier League,... HTV2 are still live normally.

Gradually, HTV2 became a general entertainment channel and a companion of small screen audiences until August 24 year 2009, when the Department of news - Communication HCMC requires the procedure for a license to transfer the channel's content.  At that time, HTV2 returned as a TV channel specializing in sports, during this time special programs sports politics  HTV2 broadcasts and wins the hearts of sports fans, especially soccer.  From October 16 year 2010, HTV2 officially returned as a general channel entertainment after the Department of Information - Media  license for this channel has been resolved. In 2018, HTV officially cooperated with Vie Channel company to develop its own identity brand as Vie Channel - HTV2.

Programmes

See also
Ho Chi Minh City
HTV7
HTV9

References

Television stations in Vietnam